Naftali Amsterdam (1832-1916) was a Lithuanian-born Orthodox rabbi and a leader in the Mussar movement.

Mussar movement role
A student of Rabbi Yisroel Salanter, the Mussar movement's founder, his teacher categorized the roles of three top followers as:
 Rabbi Yitzchok Blazer ("Reb Itzele Peterburger"): scholar
 Rabbi Simcha Zessel Ziv Broida: sage
 Rabi Naftali Amsterdam: pietist

Biography
Amsterdam was a rabbi and lived in
 Helsinki, 1867 - 1876
 St. Petersburg, 1876 - 1880
 Lithuania, 1880 - 1906 (Av Bais Din in Novograd)
 Jerusalem, 1906 - 1916. He moved to Israel shortly after the death of his wife.

He was buried on the Mount of Olives.

References

External links
 German language wiki article about Rabbi Naftali Amsterdam

1832 births
1916 deaths
Lithuanian Orthodox rabbis
People from Salantai
Burials at the Jewish cemetery on the Mount of Olives
19th-century Lithuanian rabbis
20th-century rabbis in Jerusalem
Rabbis from Kaunas
20th-century Lithuanian rabbis